Selley is a surname. Notable people with the surname include:

Harry Selley (1871–1960), English politician
Ian Selley (born 1974), English footballer and coach
Tal Selley (born 1980), Welsh rugby union player

See also
Seeley (surname)
Selleys, company